Frederick Pearson (22 December 1842 – 23 December 1890) was an officer in the United States Navy who served as the commander of the Department of Alaska from March 13, 1882, to October 3, 1882, and as commander of . during the American Civil War.

Pearson originally attended US Naval Academy from 1859 to 1861, but left to join the Navy at the start of the American Civil War. He was on  when she engaged the rebel privateer Petrel on July 28, 1861. He was commissioned as an ensign in September 1862, and retired with the rank of commander in October 1885. He died from heart problems the day after his 48th birthday.

Notes

Union Navy officers
Commanders of the Department of Alaska
1842 births
1890 deaths